Colin Fry (19 May 1962 – 25 August 2015) was a British spiritualist medium and television personality. He was one of the best known mediums in Britain bringing comfort and entertainment to many.

Biography 
Colin Fry was born on 19 May 1962 in Haywards Heath, Sussex. He claimed to have discovered psychic ability from the age of four  when he told his grandfather that his mother had “died and gone to heaven”. The next day his grandfather received a telegram that said his mother had died. 

Fry hosted a number of television programmes dealing with the supernatural, including: Most Haunted, Psychic Private Eyes and 6ixth Sense with Colin Fry, produced by Living TV. Fry, who at one time performed under the stage name of "Lincoln", was exposed in 1992 when during a séance the lights were unexpectedly turned on and he was seen holding a spirit trumpet in the air, which the audience had been led to believe was being levitated by spiritual energy.

In April 2015, Fry was diagnosed with terminal lung cancer. He died in Sussex on 25 August 2015, at the age of 53.

References

External links 
 
 Colin Fry Interview
 Obituary in The Independent by Marcus Williamson

1962 births
2015 deaths
English psychics
English spiritual mediums
English television personalities
Gay entertainers
English LGBT people
21st-century LGBT people